Morgan State University (Morgan State or MSU) is a public historically black research university in Baltimore, Maryland.  It is the largest of Maryland's historically black colleges and universities (HBCUs). In 1867, the university, then known as the Centenary Biblical Institute, changed its name to Morgan College to honor Reverend Lyttleton Morgan, the first chairman of its board of trustees and a land donor to the college. It became a university in 1975.

Morgan State is a member of Thurgood Marshall College Fund. Although a public institution, Morgan State is not part of the University System of Maryland. It is classified among "R2: Doctoral Universities – High research activity".

History

Morgan State University (MSU) is a historically black college in Baltimore, Maryland. It was founded in 1867 as the Centenary Biblical Institute, a Methodist Episcopal seminary, to train young men in the ministry. At the time of his death, Thomas Kelso, co-founder and president of the board of directors, endowed the Male Free School and Colored Institute through a legacy of his estate.

It later broadened its mission to educate both men and women as teachers. The school was renamed as Morgan College in 1890 in honor of the Reverend Lyttleton Morgan, the first chairman of its board of trustees, who donated land to the college. In 1895, the institution awarded its first baccalaureate degree to George W. F. McMechen, after whom the building of the school of business and management is named today. McMechen later earned a law degree from Yale University and, after establishing his career, became one of Morgan's main financial supporters.

In 1915, Andrew Carnegie gave the school a grant of $50,000 for a central academic building. The terms of the grant included the purchase of a new site for the College, payment of all outstanding obligations, and the construction of a building to be named after him. The College met the conditions and moved to its present site in northeast Baltimore in 1917.

In 1918, the white community of Lauraville tried to have the sale revoked by filing suit in the circuit court in Towson, upset that the Ivy Mill property, the planned location of Morgan State, had been sold to a "negro" college. The circuit court dismissed the suit, which the community appealed to the Maryland Court of Appeals. The appellate court upheld the lower court decision, finding no basis that siting the college at this location would constitute a public nuisance. Despite some ugly threats and several demonstrations against the project, Morgan College was constructed at the new site and later expanded. Carnegie Hall, the oldest original building on the present Morgan campus, was erected a year later.

Morgan remained a private institution until 1939. That year, the state of Maryland purchased the school in response to a state study that Maryland needed to provide more educational opportunities for its black citizens, as higher education was still segregated. Morgan College became Morgan State College. In 1975, Morgan State added several doctoral programs and its board of directors petitioned the Maryland Legislature to be granted university status.

In 2020, MacKenzie Scott donated $40 million to Morgan State. The donation is the largest in Morgan State's history and one of the largest ever to a HBCU. The following year, Calvin E. Tyler Jr. donated $20 million to endow scholarships for financially needy students at Morgan State. Tyler donation's is believed to be the largest donation a former student made to a historically black institution.

21st century construction

In the 21st century, the university has seen the construction of a new student union, two dedicated parking garages, the Earl S. Richardson Library, the Dixon Research Center, the Communications Building, and the Center for the Built Environment and Infrastructure Studies. The latter two buildings, plus one of the two parking garages, are in the far north of the campus, connected by a new Communications Bridge over Herring Run. The central quad was also rebuilt, completed in early 2012, and includes a direct connection between the two main bridges on campus and many new bicycle racks.

The Carl J. Murphy Fine Arts Center has become an important venue for plays and concerts visiting Baltimore, and is also the home of the James E. Lewis Museum of Art, a museum of African-American art. In September 2012, Morgan State opened the Center for the Built Environment and Infrastructure Studies (CBEIS) which houses the School of Architecture and Planning, School of Transportation Studies, and the School of Engineering.

Lastly, the university's new Earl G. Graves School of Business and Management opened its doors in September 2015 near the Northwood Shopping Center; expanding the contiguous campus to the west of Hillen Road for the first time and housing the School of Business and Management.

Academics

Morgan State awards baccalaureate, master's, and doctorate degrees. More than 7,698 students are enrolled at Morgan. Recently, emphasis has been placed on the urban orientation of the university. This emphasis has been incorporated into the graduate programs. At the graduate level, the university offers the Master of Arts, Master of Business Administration, Master of Science, Master of Education, Doctor of Education, Doctor of Philosophy, Doctor of Engineering, and Doctor of Public Health.

Enrollment
As of the fall of 2019, there are 6,491 undergraduates and 1,302 graduate students enrolled at Morgan, about 30% were non-Maryland residents, including many from foreign countries, like Saudi Arabia, Kuwait, and Nigeria. The largest sources of enrollment outside of Maryland are New York, New Jersey, and Pennsylvania.

From 2006 to 2019 the number of African-American students remained constant, but the numbers of other racial groups, including Hispanic/Latino and non-Hispanic white students increased. International students also increased in that period. In 2006 the student count was 6,700, including 60 Hispanic/Latino students, and in 2019 it was up to 7,700, including 260 Hispanic/Latino students.

Schools and colleges
The university operates twelve colleges, schools, and institutes. 

 College of Liberal Arts
 School of Business and Management
 School of Education and Urban Studies
 School of Engineering
 School of Computer, Mathematical, and Natural Sciences
 School of Graduate Studies
 School of Architecture and Planning
 School of Community Health and Policy
 Patuxent Environmental & Aquatic Research Laboratory
 School of Social Work
 School of Global Journalism and Communication
 Dr. Clara Adams Honors College

College of Liberal Arts
The College of Liberal Arts is the largest academic division at the university. In addition to offering a wide variety of degree programs, it also offers a large portion of the courses in the university's general education requirements. The College of Liberal Arts offers three doctoral programs (PhD), six Master of Arts (MA), two Master of Science (MS), eleven Bachelor of Arts (BA), two Bachelor of Science (BS), one Bachelor of Fine Arts (BFA), and twenty-three minors, all in topics such as Economics, English, History, African American Studies, African Diaspora Studies, East Asian Studies, Environmental Studies, Latino studies, Military Science, Philosophy, Screenwriting, Sociology, and World Languages, among others.

The College of Liberal Arts hosts also two museums: James E. Lewis Museum of Art and Lillie Carroll Jackson Civil Rights Museum. The James E. Lewis Museum of Art (JELMA) is the cultural extension of Morgan State University's Fine Arts academic program. The Lillie Carroll Jackson Civil Rights Museum illustrates the last recorded lynching in Maryland. Lillie Carroll Jackson, Clarence M. Mitchell, Jr., Juanita Jackson Mitchell, Carl Murphy, Thurgood Marshall, Margaret Carey, and their many allies worked to end lynching and other racial injustices in the United States.

School of Business and Management
The Earl G. Graves School of Business and Management (GSBM) is named in honor of alumnus Earl G. Graves, Sr. and is housed in the Graves School of Business and Management building, which was opened for the Fall Semester 2015 at the western edge of the campus. It is a state-of-the-art classroom, laboratory, office building, with rooms for hospitality management students to operate. The GSBM offers Bachelor of Science degrees, a Master of Business Administration, a Master of Science, and a PhD degree. These programs are accredited by The Association to Advance Collegiate Schools of Business (AACSB).

School of Education and Urban Studies
The School of Education and Urban Studies is located in Banneker Hall. The school offers undergraduate and Masters-level degree programs.

School of Engineering

The School of Engineering admitted its first class starting in 1984. The first graduates received degrees in 1988. Eugene M. DeLoatch (retired 2016) was the first Dean of the School of Engineering, having previously been Chairman of the Department of Electrical Engineering at Howard University. He was succeeded by Dr. Michael G. Spencer who was previously a professor of electrical engineering at Cornell University.

The Morgan State University, School of Engineering has ABET-accredited undergraduate programs. The school's graduate programs confer the Master of Engineering Degree, Doctor of Engineering Degree, and Master of Transportation Degree.

By 1991, the construction of the  Clarence M. Mitchell, Jr. School of Engineering building was completed, and the facility included sixteen teaching laboratories and five research laboratories. The William Donald Schaefer Building is a  addition to the Engineering School and was completed in April 1998. The facility provided instructional laboratories, classrooms, a student lounge, research laboratories and a  library annex. In 2015 Morgan State University's School of Engineering graduates provided more than two-thirds of the state's African-American Civil Engineers, 60 percent of the African-American Electrical Engineers, 80 percent of the African-American Telecommunications specialists, more than one-third of the African-American Mathematicians, and all of Maryland's Industrial Engineers.

School of Architecture and Planning (S+AP)
In 1997, it is the only HBCU to establish accredited Architecture, Landscape Architecture, and City and Regional Planning programs. A plan was announced by Earl Richardson in 2005 for the program to establish school status and it was designated as the School of Architecture and Planning (S+AP) in 2008. The Center of Built and Environmental Studies (CBEIS) was designed by Hord Coplan and Macht in association with the Freelon Group. They began construction in 2010 to house all of the related majors and the building has been declared one of the most impressive, environmentally friendly university buildings in the world. In 2018, Mary Anne Akers submitted a proposal to the Maryland Higher Education Commission to advocate for the School of Architecture and Planning to pioneer the first Interior Design baccalaureate program in Maryland, its first graduating class was in May 2020.

Library

The Earl S. Richardson Library's is the main academic information resource center on the campus. The new building covers approximately 222,517 square feet which opened in 2008. The library's holding constitutes over 500,000 volumes, and access to over 1 million e-books and 5,000 periodical titles. There are 167 online databases that are subscribed to the Library. Reading and studying spaces are provided with wired and wireless access to databases for research. One such collection in the volumes includes books on Africa, with an emphasis on sub-Saharan Africa. The African-American collection is a body of historically significant and current books by and about African Americans and includes papers and memorabilia of such persons as Emmett Jay Scott, secretary to Booker T. Washington, and Arthur J. Smith, who was associated with the Far East Consular Division of the State Department. The Forbush Collection, named for Bliss Forbush, is composed of materials associated with the Quakers and slavery. The Martin D. Jenkins Collection was acquired in 1980. Together, these collections provide both a contemporary and historical view of African Americans in education, military service, politics, and religion.
The library is located fronting Hillen Road and includes a multi-story lobby, lounges private group study rooms, meeting rooms, a technology-enhanced instruction room, computer laboratory, and other computers in many locations.

Student life and activities

Residential facilities
Approximately 2,000 students are housed in four traditional residence halls, two high rise buildings and three apartment complexes.
Baldwin Hall, Cummings Hall, Harper-Tubman House and O'Connell House are traditional style housing.

Baldwin (Freshman & transfer women)
Cummings (freshman & transfer men)
Harper-Tubman (preferred honors co-ed)
O'Connell Hall (freshman men)

Blount Towers (all women's classifications) and Rawlings Hall (all men's classifications) are high-rise (six to eight floors) residence halls. Thurgood Marshall (freshman & transfer men) is an apartment style complex located on-campus. Both Morgan View Apartments and Marble Hall Gardens are the co-ed upper-class apartment style residence hall complexes located off-campus. Morgan View is a privatized facility that caters to Morgan State students.

Athletics

Morgan's athletic teams are known as the Bears, and they compete in the Mid-Eastern Athletic Conference (MEAC).
Between 1926 and 1928, a young Charles Drew served as Athletic Director. During this time he made great improvements in the school's teams' records. From the 1930s through 1960s, led by coach and then athletic director Edward P. Hurt, Morgan's athletic teams were legendary. More than thirty of its football players were drafted by and played in the NFL and many of its track athletes competed internationally and received world-class status. By the late 1960s most white colleges and universities ended their segregation against black high school students and many top black high school students and athletes started matriculating to schools from which they had been barred just a decade prior. While achieving a national goal of desegregation, integration depleted the athletic strength of schools like Morgan State and Grambling State University. For example, the annual contest between Morgan State and Grambling played in New York City in the late 1960s drew more than 60,000 fans. Today, the two teams do not even play each other and Morgan's home football games rarely draw as many as 10,000 fans with the exception of the school's homecoming game. Morgan State archrivals are the Howard University Bison (the matchup is often called the Battle of the Beltway) and the Coppin State Eagles.

In 2021, Morgan State announced plans to revive their wrestling program that was discontinuted in 1997 thanks to a $2.7 million donation from a group dedicated to bringing back wrestling to HBCUs. The donation, the largest in Bears history, would make Morgan State the only Division I HBCU to offer wrestling.

Lacrosse
By 1975 Morgan State became noted for its lacrosse team. Lacrosse, a sport that, up until then, had been dominated by white athletes. Black high school lacrosse players in Maryland and New York still had trouble getting into non-black schools. Morgan State was the first—and, until the turn of the 20th century, the only—historically black university to field a lacrosse team.

In 2005 students organized a lacrosse club which plays other college's lacrosse clubs, but the team has yet to qualify to become an NCAA-sanctioned team. The University will not allow the new club team to use any of its fields or facilities. The club team has played more than twenty games in the last three years, most of them "away" because of the Bears' lack of a home field, locker rooms or visiting team amenities.

Basketball

In 2009, the Morgan State men's basketball team won the MEAC regular season and tournament championship and qualified for the 2009 NCAA Division I men's basketball tournament. In their first tournament appearance, the 15th-seeded Bears lost to the 2008–09 Oklahoma Sooners men's basketball team Oklahoma Sooners, 82–54, in the first round of the South Regional.

In 2010 the Morgan State men's basketball team again won the MEAC regular season and tournament championship and qualified for the 2010 NCAA Division I men's basketball tournament, again as a 15 seed. Morgan State lost to West Virginia University in the first round by a score of 77–50.

Athletic Hall of Fame

More than two hundred men and women Morgan State athletes have been inducted into the Morgan State University Hall of Fame including National Football League Hall of Famers Rosey Brown, Leroy Kelly and Willie Lanier, two-time Olympic Gold medalist George Rhoden, and the coach of the Ten Bears lacrosse team Howard "Chip" Silverman.

Choir

The Morgan State University Choir is one of the nation's most prestigious university choral ensembles and was led for more than three decades by the late Dr. Nathan Carter, celebrated conductor, composer, and arranger. The groups that are subdivisions of the critically acclaimed choir include the University Choir, which is over 140 voices strong, and The Morgan Singers (approximately 40 voices). While classical, gospel, and contemporary popular music comprise the majority of the choir's repertoire, the choir is noted for its emphasis on preserving the heritage of the spiritual, especially in the historic practices of performance. The Morgan State University Choir has performed for audiences throughout the United States and all over the world—including The Bahamas, Virgin Islands, Canary Islands, Canada, Africa, Asia, and Europe. Their most recent international appearance was in Saint Petersburg, Russia, at the invitation of Maestro Yuri Temirkanov, music director and conductor for the Baltimore Symphony Orchestra. In Russia, the choir performed in the 5th International Festival Arts Square and was received enthusiastically by their Russian audiences.

The choir has appeared at the Kennedy Center for the Performing Arts in Washington, D.C., and at the Lincoln Center and Carnegie Hall in New York City on numerous occasions, performing and premiering works such as John Corigliano's "Poem On His Birthday," "Too Hot to Handel" arranged by Broadway composers Bob Christianson and Gary Anderson and Hannibal Lokumbe's "African Portraits", led by music director Leonard Slatkin, as part of the Kennedy Center's African Festival. One of the choir's most historic moments came with the opportunity to sing under the baton of Robert Shaw, conducting the Orchestra of St. Luke's and joined by Jessye Norman and others in Carnegie Hall's One Hundredth Birthday Tribute to Marian Anderson. A major milestone and historical movement occurred during the 1996–1997 season with the sounds of the "Silver Anniversary" concert being broadcast into households throughout the state of Maryland. The concert won three Emmy Awards for Maryland Public Television (MPT). MPT continues to air this hallmark performance during select sections of their membership drives. In 1993, the choir joined actor James Earl Jones in a performance of "The Star-Spangled Banner" at the 1993 Major League Baseball All-Star Game at Oriole Park at Camden Yards, broadcast on CBS.

Known for its consistency of performances, the choir probably does more annual appearances with major orchestras of the United States than any other university choir. For example, the 1998–1999 season included performances with the National Symphony Orchestra, the New York Philharmonic, the Philadelphia Orchestra, The Buffalo Symphony Orchestra, the Baltimore Symphony, and the Knoxville Symphony Orchestra. During the 1999–2000 season, the choir was featured with the New York Philharmonic Orchestra in a then-newly commissioned work for the millennium, "All Rise", by Wynton Marsalis. The choir reprised "All Rise" in Prague, in October 2000 and recorded it with the Lincoln Center Jazz Orchestra, the Los Angeles Philharmonic and, in 2003, the choir recorded the piece in Paris, France. In December 2003 the choir performed "African Portraits" with the Baltimore Symphony at the Gala Concert for the Reginald F. Lewis Museum of Maryland African American History & Culture. In their May 2004 issue, Reader's Digest named the Morgan State University Choir as the "Best College Choir" in its list of "America's 100 Best".

Band

The Morgan State University Band Program consists of six ensembles: the marching band, symphonic band, symphonic winds, pep band, jazz ensemble, and jazz combo. Self-titled the Magnificent Marching Machine, the marching band has performed at Morgan State football games, NFL games, Presidential Inaugurations, World Series games and in regional and local television appearances. The band also made a cameo appearance in the 2003 American movie Head of State and appeared on The Skyshow, a television show featuring Tom Joyner.

On November 28, 2019, the Magnificent Marching Machine, made its first-ever appearance the Macy's Thanksgiving Day Parade.

Greek life
Morgan State University has chapters from each of the National Pan-Hellenic Council member organizations.

Morgan State University also houses a variety of other fraternal organizations. These organizations are a part of the Council of Independent Organizations (CIO).

Notable alumni and faculty

Alumni 
Alumni of Morgan State University have achieved notability in the fields of athletics, science, government, law and the military including four members of the NFL Football Hall of Fame (Willie Lanier, Roosevelt Brown, Leroy Kelly, and Len Ford), Black Enterprise Magazine publisher Earl Graves, the Chief Judge of Maryland's highest court, Clarence Dunnaville, lawyer and civil rights activist, nearly a dozen U.S. Army Generals including Lieutenant General William "Kip" Ward, the first Commanding Officer of the United States Africa Command, The New York Times sports columnist William C. Rhoden, HBCU Digest Founder Jarrett Carter Sr., playwright, TV producer, and entrepreneur David E. Talbert, and American-Israeli Olympic sprinter Donald Sanford. Civil rights activist and music critic for the Baltimore Afro-American newspaper Adah Jenkins graduated from Morgan State. Scientist and inventor Valerie Thomas is also an alumni from Morgan State.

Ed Gainey, the mayor-elect of Pittsburgh, is a 1994 graduate.

Faculty 

Former faculty member Ernest Lyon was a United States Ambassador to Liberia and the founder of the Maryland Industrial and Agricultural Institute for Colored Youths. Noted African American historian and pioneering scholar Dr. Benjamin A. Quarles served on its faculty for many decades. Physician-Scientist Charles R. Drew, known for his work on blood transfusion, was Morgan College's First Athletic Director. Flora E. Strout, Morgan College teacher and principal, wrote the school's anthem. Notable faculty currently teaching at Morgan State University include bestselling author and filmmaker MK Asante, and scholar Raymond Winbush, and African-American historian Rosalyn Terborg-Penn.

Notes
Iota Phi Theta was founded at Morgan State University on September 19, 1963.

References

External links

 
 Morgan State Athletics website

 
1867 establishments in Maryland
Educational institutions established in 1867
Historically black universities and colleges in the United States
Public universities and colleges in Maryland
Universities and colleges in Baltimore